Holt's may refer to:

Holt's Military Banking, a trading name of The Royal Bank of Scotland, part of the NatWest Group
Holt's Wharf, a former railway and freight hub in Hong Kong
Holt Renfrew, a Canadian department store chain, owned by Selfridges Group

See also
Holt (disambiguation)